The Zinoro 60H is a plug-in hybrid compact crossover SUV produced by BMW Brilliance under the Chinese automobile brand Zinoro. It launched in the Chinese market in March 2017.

Overview
At the Auto Shanghai in April 2015, Zinoro presented for the first time with the 'Concept Next', a preview of the successor to the first-generation BMW X1 electric-powered Zinoro 1E. The production vehicle was presented in August 2016. The 60H is based on the second-generation exclusive version of the BMW X1 and is powered by the BMW 2 Series Active Tourer Plug-in hybrid. In the Chinese market, the SUV was launched on 23 March 2017.

Powertrain
The plug-in hybrid drivetrain of the Zinoro 60H consists of a 136hp 1.5 liter turbo engine and a 15hp electric motor, good for a combined output of 151hp. Zinoro claims a 0-100 acceleration time of 7.6 seconds, a fuel consumption of 1.8 liter per 100 kilometer and a pure electric range of 60 kilometer. As for the naming, 60 stands for range and H stands for hybrid.

References

Brilliance Auto vehicles
Cars of China
Compact sport utility vehicles
Luxury crossover sport utility vehicles
All-wheel-drive vehicles
Luxury sport utility vehicles
Hybrid sport utility vehicles
Cars introduced in 2016
2010s cars
Plug-in hybrid vehicles